Robert Edward Lin Nelson (November 26, 1934 – May 8, 2015) was a Hawaiian songwriter, composer, pianist, and singer. He is best known for his most popular songs, "Hanalei Moon" and "Maui Waltz". He was also a staunch defender of the copyrights and royalties of Hawaiian songwriters and composers, and served on advisory boards at ASCAP for two decades. In 2013 he received the Lifetime Achievement Award from the Hawaii Academy of Recording Arts.

Career

Songwriting and performing
Nelson was born in 1934 in Wailuku, Maui. For his musical career he moved to Oahu, where he wrote songs and performed. He was interviewed as a songwriter by the Honolulu Advertiser in 1969. He played the piano bar at the Yacht Harbor Towers in Honolulu from 1976 to 1988.

In the 1970s and 1980s, Nelson wrote several popular songs, such as "Hanalei Moon" (1974), "Maui Waltz" (1975), and "Just a Little Girl". In 1976 "Hanalei Moon" received the award for Best New Song at the first Nani Awards, the predecessor to the Na Hoku Hanohano Awards. In 1978 he was nominated for Best Composer, and his song "Maui Waltz" was nominated for Best Song, at the very first Na Hoku Hanohano Awards. In 1978 "Hanalei Moon" and "Maui Waltz" were among the top 15 most-popular songs in Hawaii.

In 1980, he released an album of 13 of his songs titled Bob Nelson & Friends. His album Bob Nelson Live at the Piano won the 1986 Na Hoku Hanohano award for Instrumental Album of the Year.

He was interviewed at length in the late 1970s by Ron Jacobs on Hawaii Public Radio station KKUA, and the tape of the interview was donated in 1979 to the Hawaiian Music Preservation Hall and Academy.

In 2013 Nelson received the Lifetime Achievement Award from the Hawaii Academy of Recording Arts.

Songwriters' advocacy
Throughout his career Nelson was a staunch advocate for Hawaiian songwriters' and composers' copyrights and royalties, writing articles and giving workshops on how to register and protect copyrights and safeguard royalties.

Nelson was the President of the Hawaii Composers Organization beginning in 1975, and spearheaded the Hawaiian Professional Songwriters Society beginning in the late 1970s.

In 1977 he was selected as ASCAP's resident representative in Hawaii, and he remained on ASCAP advisory boards for 17 years.

Personal life
Born Robert (Bob) Edward Lin Nelson, he was 1 of 2 children born to Margaret Thomas. Margaret was married to (Scandinavian) John Nelson. Bob was the eldest, followed by his younger sister, Jan. Bob married Carolyn Sue Sanders, a young model from Illinois, in which they had 3 children together. They met in the entertainment industry during the early 60's. Bob was acting, singing and writing music, playing piano regularly at the Willows in Waikiki, and Carolyn (soon to change her name: SuSu), was a professional model. The two sang and wrote many songs together, the most popular being, "Hanalei Moon" and "Just a Little Girl". Once Bob became well-known for his role on Hawaii Five-O, the two would through Hollywood style parties where you might see many celebrities, artists/musicians or high-profile locals. Their first daughter was born, Tala, in April 1967, it wasn't long after until a son was born, Skya. He arrived in December 1968, soon to follow was their last child, another daughter named Derra in November 1969. Bob and SuSu separated in mid 1973 and SuSu moved with the children to the Southern California coastline on the mainland. The 3 children visited Bob every summer until they were teenagers. The family became distant in travel, but stayed close over the years. Bob married his long time love, Irene. Bob and Irene performed on some Hawaiian cruises in and around the outer islands. Bob was to play and sing his memorable and catchy songs, while Irene would teach and perform the hula. The pair were well known and captivated the cruisers with such authentic island melodies. After many years in Hawai'i Bob and Irene had an opportunity to move to Scottsdale, Arizona.  where his long time, best friend Khigh Dhiegh lived. Bob continued to perform at the Biltmore in Scottsdale over many years and occasionally performed for private engagements.

Bob moved back to Honolulu late in life after Irene took ill. He performed every Wednesday night at the Honolulu Elks Club. He passed away at the age of 80 in May 2015, surrounded by his loving ohana.

References

1934 births
2015 deaths
People from Wailuku, Hawaii
Musicians from Honolulu
Na Hoku Hanohano Award winners
People of the Territory of Hawaii
Hawaiian songwriters
20th-century American pianists
American male composers
ASCAP composers and authors
20th-century American male musicians